Heronidrilus gravidus is a species of oligochaete worm, first found in Belize, on the Caribbean side of Central America.

References

Further reading

Erséus, Christer, and Hongzhu Wang. "Marine Tubificidae (Oligochaeta) of the Dampier area, Western Australia, Perth, Western Australian Museum (2003).

External links

WORMS

Tubificina
Taxa named by Christer Erséus